Rivoli Cinemas (also known as Rivoli Theatre and New Rivoli Theatre) is an eight-screen multiplex in the Hawthorn East suburb of Melbourne. Noted for its Art Deco architecture, the cinema was first built in 1940, and reopened as a multiplex in 2000 following a renovation and expansion.

History of the cinema
Located at 200 Camberwell Road, Rivoli Cinemas opened on 11 October 1940, with a showing of French Without Tears, starring Ray Milland. It had a capacity of 1,644 (Stalls 1004; Circle 640).

It replaced a 1921 theatre of the same name, that had been located in Burke Road and designed by Frank Richardson. Robert McGleish, a notable figure in the Melbourne cinema scene of the time and manager of the first Rivoli, was responsible for the new cinema's construction and it was designed by architects H. Vivian Taylor and Soilleaux.

In 1968, it was the first cinema in Australia to be converted to twin auditoriums, enabling cinema goers to choose which movie to watch. The main auditorium was split with the balcony becoming the main cinema, retaining the elaborate plasterwork, while the smaller cinema created in the stalls area did not.

This action may have allowed the cinema to weather the post-war decline into the 1990s when cinema going regained popularity. An extensive $16 million restoration and expansion began in 1999, including a large addition on the west side of the building to incorporate six new screens.

In 2005, the Rivoli was added to the Victorian Heritage Register.

Architecture 

The Rivoli Cinemas is an excellent example of Streamline Moderne, also known as Art Moderne, the late 1930s version of Art Deco architecture. It is the only intact surviving example in Victoria of the work of cinema specialist architects H. Vivian Taylor and Soilleaux, a practice responsible for the architecture or acoustics of more than 500 cinemas and theatres in Australia. The citation notes its impressive external brickwork and internal plasterwork.

The exterior façade features distinctive horizontal banded brickwork in shades of pink and oatmeal and a vertical fin. To the east is a curved-walled balcony, and the west angle incorporates a roof garden. The ground level walls around the doors originally featured cream and orange ceramic tiles, lost during succeeding alterations but reinstated in 1999–2000, along with the Art Deco-style signage on the fin.

The interior of the cinema was the height of luxury when it opened, featuring a circular ticket hall on the lower level and dramatic circular staircase up to a lounge above, also an access point for the roof garden. The two-level auditorium had plaster walls and ceiling, constructed independently of the structure and considered to be an innovation. Grilles were added for decoration and to house acoustics, with lighting largely concealed behind plasterwork. Renovation work in 1999–2000, while adding substantial new areas to the building, retained original plasterwork in the largely untouched upper auditorium. The foyers, circular staircase and upper lounge are also largely original.

Due to the significance of the cinema, restoration was undertaken in consultation with Heritage Victoria and the Melbourne-based Art Deco & Modernism Society (ADMS) to ensure the fabric and quality of the original architecture was maintained.

Cinema ghosts 

Rivoli Cinemas was cited in an ABC science feature in 2003 on research into the existence or otherwise of ghosts. According to cinema staff, several spirits inhabited the building, including a man in Row P of Cinema One.

References

External links
Official website
Time out review and map
Cinema history, including films shown
Cinema feature from Cinema and Theatre Historical Society
Auditorium images

1940 establishments in Australia
Art Deco architecture in Melbourne
Buildings and structures in the City of Boroondara
Cinemas in Melbourne
Streamline Moderne architecture in Australia
Streamline Moderne Cinemas
Heritage-listed buildings in Melbourne
Theatres completed in 1940